= Ray Whelan =

Australian rules footballer

Personal information
- Full name: Raymond Edward James Whelan
- Born: 4 November 1921; Adelaide, South Australia
- Died: 24 December 2002 (aged 81)

Playing career^{1}
Years	Club	Games (Goals)
1943-1951	Sturt	100 (24)
- ^{1} Playing statistics correct to the end of 1951.

Raymond Edward James "Rusty" Whelan (4 November 1921 – 24 December 2002) was an Australian rules footballer who played 100 games for the Sturt Football Club in the South Australian National Football League (SANFL).

Prior to playing with Sturt, Whelan served in the Australian Army during World War II.
